Lissonotus andalgalensis is a species of beetle in the family Cerambycidae. It was described by Bruch in 1908.

References

Cerambycinae
Beetles described in 1908